is a Japanese judoka.

References

External links
 
 
 Sportare 

Japanese female judoka
1983 births
Living people
Olympic judoka of Japan
Judoka at the 2008 Summer Olympics
People from Western Tokyo
Place of birth missing (living people)
Asian Games medalists in judo
Judoka at the 2006 Asian Games
Asian Games gold medalists for Japan
Medalists at the 2006 Asian Games
20th-century Japanese women
21st-century Japanese women